There are over 3,000 radio stations in China. The Central People's Broadcasting Station, the nation's official radio station, has eight channels, and broadcasts for a total of over 200 hours per day via satellite. 

Every province, autonomous region and municipality has local broadcasting stations. China Radio International (CRI), the only national overseas broadcasting station, is beamed to all parts of the world in 38 foreign languages, standard Chinese and four Chinese dialects, and broadcasts for a total of over 300 hours every day. It offers various special programs of news, current affairs, comment, entertainment, politics, economy, culture, technology and so on. Currently, CRI ranks third in overseas broadcasting time and languages in the world.

See also
List of Chinese-language radio stations